Charles Robert Sevior (11 May 1908 – 28 May 1988) was an Australian rules footballer who played with Essendon in the Victorian Football League (VFL).

Notes

External links 

1908 births
1988 deaths
Australian rules footballers from Melbourne
Essendon Football Club players
People from Flemington, Victoria